Stalinism is the means of governing and Marxist–Leninist policies implemented in the Soviet Union from 1927 to 1953 by Joseph Stalin. It included the creation of a one-party totalitarian police state, rapid industrialization, the theory of that socialism in one country (until 1939), collectivization of agriculture, intensification of class conflict, colonization of Eastern Europe (since 1939), a cult of personality, and subordination of the interests of foreign communist parties to those of the Communist Party of the Soviet Union, deemed by Stalinism to be the leading vanguard party of communist revolution at the time. After Stalin's death and the Khrushchev Thaw, de-Stalinization began in the 1950s and 1960s, which caused the influence of Stalin’s ideology begin to wane in the USSR. The second wave of de-Stalinization started during Mikhail Gorbachev’s Soviet Glasnost.

Stalin's regime forcibly purged society of what it saw as threats to itself and its brand of communism (so-called "enemies of the people"), which included political dissidents, non-Soviet nationalists, the bourgeoisie, better-off peasants ("kulaks"), and those of the working class who demonstrated "counter-revolutionary" sympathies. This resulted in mass repression of such people and their families, including mass arrests, show trials, executions, and imprisonment in forced labour and concentration camps known as gulags. The most notorious examples were the Great Purge and the Dekulakization campaign. Stalinism was also marked by militant atheism, mass anti-religious persecution, and ethnic cleansing through forced deportations. However, there was a short era of reconciliation between the Orthodox Church and the state authorities in WW2. Some historians, such as Robert Service, have blamed Stalinist policies, particularly the collectivization policies, for causing famines such as the Holodomor. Other historians and scholars disagree on the role of Stalinism.

Officially designed to accelerate development towards communism, the need for industrialization in the Soviet Union was emphasized because the Soviet Union had previously fallen behind economically compared to Western countries and that socialist society needed industry to face the challenges posed by internal and external enemies of communism. Rapid industrialization was accompanied by mass collectivization of agriculture and rapid urbanization, which converted many small villages into industrial cities. To accelerate the development of industrialization, Stalin imported materials, ideas, expertise, and workers from western Europe and the United States, pragmatically setting up joint-venture contracts with major American private enterprises such as the Ford Motor Company, which, under state supervision, assisted in developing the basis of the industry of the Soviet economy from the late 1920s to the 1930s. After the American private enterprises had completed their tasks, Soviet state enterprises took over.

History 

Stalinism is used to describe the period during which Joseph Stalin was the leader of the Soviet Union while serving as General Secretary of the Central Committee of the Communist Party of the Soviet Union from 1922 to his death on 5 March 1953.

Etymology 
The term Stalinism came into prominence during the mid-1930s when Lazar Kaganovich, a Soviet politician and associate of Stalin, reportedly declared: "Let's replace Long Live Leninism with Long Live Stalinism!" Stalin dismissed this as excessive and contributing to a cult of personality which he thought might be used against him at a later date by the same people who praised him excessively, one of those being Khrushchev - a prominent user of term Stalinism in Stalin's life who would later be responsible for de-Stalinization and the beginning of the Revisionist period in the USSR.

Stalinist policies 

While some historians view Stalinism as a reflection of the ideologies of Leninism and Marxism, some argue that it stands separate from the socialist ideals it stemmed from. After a political struggle that culminated in the defeat of the Bukharinists (the "Party's Right Tendency"), Stalinism was free to shape policy without opposition, ushering forth an era of harsh authoritarianism that worked toward rapid industrialization regardless of the cost.

From 1917 to 1924, though often appearing united, Stalin, Vladimir Lenin, and Leon Trotsky had discernible ideological differences. In his dispute with Trotsky, Stalin de-emphasized the role of workers in advanced capitalist countries (e.g. he considered the American working-class "bourgeoisified" labour aristocracy). Stalin also polemicized against Trotsky on the role of peasants as in China, whereas Trotsky's position favoured urban insurrection over peasant-based guerrilla warfare.

All other October Revolution 1917 Bolshevik leaders regarded their revolution more or less just as the beginning, with Russia as the springboard on the road towards the World Wide Revolution. Stalin would eventually introduce the idea of socialism in one country by the autumn of 1924, a theory standing in sharp contrast to Trotsky's permanent revolution and all earlier socialistic theses. However, the revolution did not spread outside Russia as Lenin had assumed it soon would. The revolution had not succeeded even within other former territories of the Russian Empire―such as Poland, Finland, Lithuania, Latvia and Estonia. On the contrary, these countries had returned to capitalist bourgeois rule.

Despite this, by the autumn of 1924, Stalin's notion of socialism in Soviet Russia was initially considered next to blasphemy in the ears of other Politburo members, including Zinoviev and Kamenev to the intellectual left; Rykov, Bukharin, and Tomsky to the pragmatic right; and the powerful Trotsky, who belonged to no side but his own. None would even consider Stalin's concept a potential addition to communist ideology. Stalin's socialism in one country doctrine could not be imposed until he, himself, had become close to being the autocratic ruler of the Soviet Union around 1929. Bukharin and the Right Opposition expressed their support for imposing Stalin's ideas, as Trotsky had been exiled, whereas Zinoviev and Kamenev had been thrown out of the party.

Proletarian state 
Traditional communist thought holds that the state will gradually "wither away" as the implementation of socialism reduces class distinction. However, Stalin argued that the proletarian state (as opposed to the bourgeois state) must become stronger before it can wither away. In Stalin's view, counter-revolutionary elements will attempt to derail the transition to full communism, and the state must be powerful enough to defeat them. For this reason, communist regimes influenced by Stalin are totalitarian. Other leftists, such as anarcho-communists, have criticized the party-state of the Stalin-era Soviet Union, accusing it of being bureaucratic and calling it a reformist social democracy rather than a form of revolutionary communism.

Sheng Shicai, a Chinese warlord with Communist leanings, invited Soviet intervention and allowed Stalinist rule to be extended to the Xinjiang province in the 1930s. In 1937, Sheng conducted a purge similar to the Great Purge, imprisoning, torturing, and killing about 100,000 people, many of whom were Uyghurs.

Class-based violence 
Stalin blamed the kulaks as the inciters of reactionary violence against the people during the implementation of agricultural collectivization. In response, the state, under Stalin's leadership, initiated a violent campaign against the kulaks. This kind of campaign would later be known as classicide, though several international legislatures have passed resolutions declaring the campaign a genocide. Some historians dispute that these social-class actions constitute genocide.

Purges and executions 

As head of the Politburo of the Communist Party of the Soviet Union, Stalin consolidated near-absolute power in the 1930s with a Great Purge of the party that claimed to expel "opportunists" and "counter-revolutionary infiltrators." Those targeted by the purge were often expelled from the party, though more severe measures ranged from banishment to the Gulag labour camps to execution after trials held by NKVD troikas.

In the 1930s, Stalin became increasingly worried about the growing popularity of the Leningrad party head Sergei Kirov. At the 1934 Party Congress, where the vote for the new Central Committee was held, Kirov received only three negative votes (the fewest of any candidate), while Stalin received at least over a hundred negative votes. After the assassination of Kirov, which Stalin may have orchestrated, Stalin invented a detailed scheme to implicate opposition leaders in the murder, including Trotsky, Lev Kamenev, and Grigory Zinoviev. From thereon, the investigations and trials expanded. Stalin passed a new law on "terrorist organizations and terrorist acts" that were to be investigated for no more than ten days, with no prosecution, defence attorneys, or appeals, followed by a sentence to be executed "quickly."

After that, several trials, known as the Moscow Trials, were held, but the procedures were replicated throughout the country. Article 58 of the legal code, which listed prohibited anti-Soviet activities as a counter-revolutionary crime, was applied most broadly. Many alleged anti-Soviet pretexts were used to brand individuals as "enemies of the people", starting the cycle of public persecution, often proceeding to interrogation, torture, and deportation, if not death. The Russian word troika thereby gained a new meaning: a quick, simplified trial by a committee of three subordinated to the NKVD troika—with sentencing carried out within 24 hours. Stalin's hand-picked executioner Vasili Blokhin was entrusted with carrying out some of the high-profile executions in this period.

Many military leaders were convicted of treason, and a large-scale purge of Red Army officers followed. The repression of many formerly high-ranking revolutionaries and party members led Leon Trotsky to claim that a "river of blood" separated Stalin's regime from that of Lenin. In August 1940, Trotsky was assassinated in Mexico, where he had lived in exile since January 1937—this eliminated the last of Stalin's opponents among the former Party leadership. Except for Vladimir Milyutin (who died in prison in 1937) and Stalin himself, all of the members of Lenin's original cabinet who had not succumbed to death from natural causes before the purge were executed.

Mass operations of the NKVD also targeted "national contingents" (foreign ethnicities) such as Poles, ethnic Germans, and Koreans. A total of 350,000 (144,000 of them Poles) were arrested and 247,157 (110,000 Poles) were executed. Many Americans who had emigrated to the Soviet Union during the worst of the Great Depression were executed, while others were sent to prison camps or gulags. Concurrent with the purges, efforts were made to rewrite the history in Soviet textbooks and other propaganda materials. Notable people executed by NKVD were removed from the texts and photographs as though they never existed. Gradually, the history of the revolution was transformed into a story about just two key characters, i.e. Lenin and Stalin.

In light of revelations from Soviet archives, historians now estimate that nearly 700,000 people (353,074 in 1937 and 328,612 in 1938) were executed in the course of the terror, with the great mass of victims merely "ordinary" Soviet citizens: workers, peasants, homemakers, teachers, priests, musicians, soldiers, pensioners, ballerinas, and beggars. Many of the executed were interred in mass graves, with some significant killing and burial sites being Bykivnia, Kurapaty, and Butovo.

Some Western experts believe the evidence released from the Soviet archives is understated, incomplete or unreliable. Conversely, historian Stephen G. Wheatcroft, who spent a good portion of his academic career researching the archives, contends that, prior to the collapse of the Soviet Union and the opening of the archives for historical research, "our understanding of the scale and the nature of Soviet repression has been extremely poor" and that some specialists who wish to maintain earlier high estimates of the Stalinist death toll are "finding it difficult to adapt to the new circumstances when the archives are open and when there are plenty of irrefutable data" and instead "hang on to their old Sovietological methods with round-about calculations based on odd statements from emigres and other informants who are supposed to have superior knowledge."

Stalin personally signed 357 proscription lists in 1937 and 1938 that condemned to execute some 40,000 people, about 90% of whom are confirmed to have been shot. While reviewing one such list, he reportedly muttered to no one in particular: "Who's going to remember all this riff-raff in ten or twenty years time? No one. Who remembers the names now of the boyars Ivan the Terrible got rid of? No one." In addition, Stalin dispatched a contingent of NKVD operatives to Mongolia, established a Mongolian version of the NKVD troika, and unleashed a bloody purge in which tens of thousands were executed as "Japanese spies", as Mongolian ruler Khorloogiin Choibalsan closely followed Stalin's lead.

During the 1930s and 1940s, the Soviet leadership sent NKVD squads into other countries to murder defectors and opponents of the Soviet regime. Victims of such plots included Yevhen Konovalets, Ignace Poretsky, Rudolf Klement, Alexander Kutepov, Evgeny Miller, Leon Trotsky, and the Workers' Party of Marxist Unification (POUM) leadership in Catalonia (e.g. Andréu Nin Pérez).

Deportations 

Shortly before, during, and immediately after World War II, Stalin conducted a broad-scale series of deportations that profoundly affected the ethnic map of the Soviet Union. Separatism, resistance to Soviet rule, and collaboration with the invading Germans were the official reasons for the deportations. Individual circumstances of those spending time in German-occupied territories were not examined. After the brief Nazi occupation of the Caucasus, the entire population of five of the small highland peoples and the Crimean Tatars—more than a million people in total—were deported without notice or any opportunity to take their possessions.

As a result of Stalin's lack of trust in the loyalty of particular ethnicities, ethnic groups such as the Soviet Koreans, Volga Germans, Crimean Tatars, Chechens, and many Poles, were forcibly moved out of strategic areas and relocated to places in the central Soviet Union, especially Kazakhstan in Soviet Central Asia. By some estimates, hundreds of thousands of deportees may have died en route. It is estimated that between 1941 and 1949, nearly 3.3 million were deported to Siberia and the Central Asian republics. By some estimates, up to 43% of the resettled population died of diseases and malnutrition.

According to official Soviet estimates, more than 14 million people passed through the gulags from 1929 to 1953, with a further 7 to 8 million being deported and exiled to remote areas of the Soviet Union (including entire nationalities in several cases). The emergent scholarly consensus is that from 1930 to 1953, around 1.5 to 1.7 million perished in the gulag system.

In February 1956, Nikita Khrushchev condemned the deportations as a violation of Leninism and reversed most of them, although it was not until 1991 that the Tatars, Meskhetians, and Volga Germans were allowed to return en masse to their homelands. The deportations had a profound effect on the people of the Soviet Union. The memory of the deportations has played a significant part in the separatist movements in the Baltic states, Tatarstan, and Chechnya, even today.

Economic policy 

At the start of the 1930s, Stalin launched a wave of radical economic policies that completely overhauled the industrial and agricultural face of the Soviet Union. This became known as the Great Turn as Russia turned away from the mixed-economic type New Economic Policy (NEP) and adopted a planned economy. The NEP was implemented by Lenin to ensure the survival of the socialist state following seven years of war (World War I, 1914–1917, and the subsequent Civil War, 1917–1921) and rebuilt Soviet production to its 1913 levels. However, Russia still lagged far behind the West, and the NEP was felt by Stalin and the majority of the Communist Party, not only to be compromising communist ideals but also not delivering satisfactory economic performance as well as not creating the envisaged socialist society. It was felt necessary to increase the pace of industrialization in order to catch up with the West.

Fredric Jameson has said that "Stalinism was…a success and fulfilled its historic mission, socially as well as economically" given that it "modernized the Soviet Union, transforming a peasant society into an industrial state with a literate population and a remarkable scientific superstructure." Robert Conquest disputed such a conclusion, noting that "Russia had already been fourth to fifth among industrial economies before World War I" and that Russian industrial advances could have been achieved without collectivization, famine, or terror. According to Conquest, the industrial successes were far less than claimed, and the Soviet-style industrialization was "an anti-innovative dead-end." Stephen Kotkin said those who argue collectivization was necessary are "dead wrong", arguing that such "only seemed necessary within the straitjacket of Communist ideology and its repudiation of capitalism. And economically, collectivization failed to deliver." Kotkin further claimed that it decreased harvests instead of increasing them as peasants tended to resist heavy taxes by producing less goods and only care about their own subsistence.

According to several Western historians, Stalinist agricultural policies were a key factor in causing the Soviet famine of 1932–1933, which the Ukrainian government now calls the Holodomor, recognizing it as an act of genocide. Some scholars dispute the intentionality of the famine.

Relationship to Leninism 

Stalin considered the political and economic system under his rule to be Marxism–Leninism, which he considered the only legitimate successor of Marxism and Leninism. The historiography of Stalin is diverse, with many different aspects of continuity and discontinuity between the regimes Stalin and Lenin proposed. Some historians, such as Richard Pipes, consider Stalinism as the natural consequence of Leninism, that Stalin "faithfully implemented Lenin's domestic and foreign policy programs." Robert Service notes that "institutionally and ideologically Lenin laid the foundations for a Stalin [...] but the passage from Leninism to the worse terrors of Stalinism was not smooth and inevitable." Likewise, historian and Stalin biographer Edvard Radzinsky believes that Stalin was a genuine follower of Lenin, exactly as he claimed himself. Another Stalin biographer, Stephen Kotkin, wrote that "his violence was not the product of his subconscious but of the Bolshevik engagement with Marxist–Leninist ideology."

Dmitri Volkogonov, who wrote biographies of both Lenin and Stalin, explained that during the 1960s through 1980s, an official patriotic Soviet de-Stalinized view of the Lenin–Stalin relationship (i.e. during the Khrushchev Thaw and later) was that the overly-autocratic Stalin had distorted the Leninism of the wise dedushka Lenin. However, Volkogonov also lamented that this view eventually dissolved for those like him who had the scales fall from their eyes immediately before and after the dissolution of the Soviet Union. After researching the biographies in the Soviet archives, he came to the same conclusion as Radzinsky and Kotkin, i.e. that Lenin had built a culture of violent autocratic totalitarianism, of which Stalinism was a logical extension. He lamented that, while Stalin had long since fallen in the estimation of many Soviet minds (the many who agreed with de-Stalinization), "Lenin was the last bastion" in Volkogonov's mind to fall, and the fall was the most painful, given the secular apotheosis of Lenin that all Soviet children grew up with.

Proponents of continuity cite a variety of contributory factors, in that it was Lenin, rather than Stalin, whose civil war measures introduced the Red Terror with its hostage-taking and internment camps; that it was Lenin who developed the infamous Article 58 and who established the autocratic system within the Communist Party. They also note that Lenin put a ban on factions within the Russian Communist Party and introduced the one-party state in 1921—a move that enabled Stalin to get rid of his rivals easily after Lenin's death and cite Felix Dzerzhinsky, who, during the Bolshevik struggle against opponents in the Russian Civil War, exclaimed: "We stand for organized terror—this should be frankly stated."

Opponents of this view include revisionist historians and many post-Cold War and otherwise dissident Soviet historians, including Roy Medvedev, who argues that although "one could list the various measures carried out by Stalin that were actually a continuation of anti-democratic trends and measures implemented under Lenin…in so many ways, Stalin acted, not in line with Lenin's clear instructions, but in defiance of them." In doing so, some historians have tried to distance Stalinism from Leninism to undermine the totalitarian view that the negative facets of Stalin were inherent in communism from the start. Critics include anti-Stalinist communists such as Leon Trotsky, who pointed out that Lenin attempted to persuade the Communist Party to remove Stalin from his post as its General Secretary. Lenin's Testament, the document which contained this order, was suppressed after Lenin's death. In his biography of Trotsky, British historian Isaac Deutscher says that, on being faced with the evidence, "only the blind and the deaf could be unaware of the contrast between Stalinism and Leninism."

A similar analysis is present in more recent works such as those of Graeme Gill, who argues that "[Stalinism was] not a natural flow-on of earlier developments; [it formed a] sharp break resulting from conscious decisions by leading political actors." However, Gill notes that "difficulties with the use of the term reflect problems with the concept of Stalinism itself. The major difficulty is a lack of agreement about what should constitute Stalinism." Revisionist historians such as Sheila Fitzpatrick have criticized the focus on the upper levels of society and the use of Cold War concepts such as totalitarianism which have obscured the reality of the system.

Legacy 

Pierre du Bois argues that the cult was elaborately constructed to legitimize his rule. Many deliberate distortions and falsehoods were used. The Kremlin refused access to archival records that might reveal the truth, and critical documents were destroyed. Photographs were altered, and documents were invented. People who knew Stalin were forced to provide "official" accounts to meet the ideological demands of the cult, especially as Stalin presented it in 1938 in Short Course on the History of the All-Union Communist Party (Bolsheviks), which became the official history. Historian David L. Hoffmann sums up the consensus of scholars: "The Stalin cult was a central element of Stalinism, and as such, it was one of the most salient features of Soviet rule. [...] Many scholars of Stalinism cite the cult as integral to Stalin's power or as evidence of Stalin's megalomania."

However, after Stalin died in 1953, his successor Nikita Khrushchev repudiated his policies and condemned Stalin's cult of personality in his Secret Speech to the Twentieth Party Congress in 1956 and instituting de-Stalinization and relative liberalization (within the same political framework). Consequently, some of the world's communist parties who previously adhered to Stalinism abandoned it and, to a greater or lesser degree, adopted the positions of Khrushchev except for the German Democratic Republic and the Socialist Republic of Romania. Others, such as the Chinese Communist Party, chose to split from the Soviet Union, resulting in the Sino-Soviet split. The ousting of Khrushchev in 1964 by his former party-state allies has been described as a Stalinist restoration by some, epitomized by the Brezhnev Doctrine and the apparatchik/nomenklatura "stability of cadres", lasting until the period of glasnost and perestroika in the late 1980s and the fall of the Soviet Union.

Maoism and Hoxhaism 
Mao Zedong famously declared that Stalin was 70% good and 30% bad. Maoists criticized Stalin chiefly regarding his view that bourgeois influence within the Soviet Union was primarily a result of external forces, to the almost complete exclusion of internal forces, and his view that class contradictions ended after the basic construction of socialism. However, they praised Stalin for leading the Soviet Union and the international proletariat, defeating fascism in Germany and his anti-revisionism.

Taking the side of the Chinese Communist Party in the Sino-Soviet split, the People's Socialist Republic of Albania remained committed, at least theoretically, to its brand of Stalinism (Hoxhaism) for decades after that under the leadership of Enver Hoxha. Despite their initial cooperation against "revisionism", Hoxha denounced Mao as a revisionist, along with almost every other self-identified communist organization worldwide, resulting in the Sino-Albanian split. This effectively isolated Albania from the rest of the world, as Hoxha was hostile to both the pro-American and pro-Soviet spheres of influence and the Non-Aligned Movement under the leadership of Josip Broz Tito, whom Hoxha had also previously denounced.

Trotskyism 
Trotskyists argue that the Stalinist Soviet Union was neither socialist nor communist but rather a bureaucratized degenerated workers' state—that is, a non-capitalist state in which exploitation is controlled by a ruling caste which, although not owning the means of production and not constituting a social class in its own right, accrued benefits and privileges at the expense of the working class. Trotsky believed that the Bolshevik Revolution needed to be spread all over the globe's working class, the proletarians, for world revolution. However, after the failure of the revolution in Germany, Stalin reasoned that industrializing and consolidating Bolshevism in Russia would best serve the proletariat in the long run. The dispute did not end until Trotsky's assassination in his Mexican villa by Stalinist assassin Ramón Mercader in 1940.

Max Shachtman, one of the principal Trotskyist theorists in the United States, argued that the Soviet Union had evolved from a degenerated worker's state to a new mode of production called bureaucratic collectivism, whereby orthodox Trotskyists considered the Soviet Union an ally gone astray. Shachtman and his followers thus argued for the formation of a Third Camp opposed to the Soviet and capitalist blocs equally. By the mid-20th century, Shachtman and many of his associates, such as Social Democrats, USA, identified as social democrats rather than Trotskyists, while some ultimately abandoned socialism altogether and embraced neoconservatism. In the United Kingdom, Tony Cliff independently developed a critique of state capitalism that resembled Shachtman's in some respects, but it retained a commitment to revolutionary communism.

Other interpretations 

Some historians and writers, such as German Dietrich Schwanitz, draw parallels between Stalinism and the economic policy of Tsar Peter the Great, although Schwanitz, in particular, views Stalin as "a monstrous reincarnation" of him. Both men wanted Russia to leave the western European states far behind in terms of development. Both largely succeeded, turning Russia into Europe's leading power. Others compare Stalin with Ivan the Terrible because of his policies of oprichnina and the restriction of the liberties of common people.

Some reviewers have considered Stalinism as a form of "red fascism". Although fascist regimes were ideologically opposed to the Soviet Union, some positively regarded Stalinism as evolving Bolshevism into a form of fascism. Benito Mussolini positively reviewed Stalinism as having transformed Soviet Bolshevism into a Slavic fascism.

British historian Michael Ellman had written that mass deaths from famines are not a "uniquely Stalinist evil", noting that throughout Russian history, famines and droughts have been a common occurrence, including the Russian famine of 1921–22 (which occurred before Stalin came to power). He also notes that famines were widespread worldwide in the 19th and 20th centuries in countries such as India, Ireland, Russia and China. Ellman compared the behaviour of the Stalinist regime vis-à-vis the Holodomor to that of the British government (towards Ireland and India) and the G8 in contemporary times, arguing that the G8 "are guilty of mass manslaughter or mass deaths from criminal negligence because of their not taking obvious measures to reduce mass deaths" and that the "behaviour [of Stalin] was no worse than that of many rulers in the nineteenth and twentieth centuries".

David L. Hoffmann raised the issue of whether Stalinist practices of state violence derived from socialist ideology. Placing Stalinism in an international context, Hoffman argued that many forms of state interventionism used by the Stalinist government, including social cataloguing, surveillance and concentration camps, predated the Soviet regime and originated outside of Russia. Hoffman further argued that technologies of social intervention developed in conjunction with the work of 19th-century European reformers and were greatly expanded during World War I when state actors in all the combatant countries dramatically increased efforts to mobilize and control their populations. According to Hoffman, the Soviet state was born at this moment of total war and institutionalized practices state intervention practices as permanent governance features.

In writing The Mortal Danger: Misconceptions about Soviet Russia and the Threat to America, anti-communist and Soviet dissident Aleksandr Solzhenitsyn argued that the use of the term Stalinism is an excuse to hide the inevitable effects of communism as a whole on human liberties. He wrote that the concept of Stalinism was developed after 1956 by Western intellectuals to be able to keep alive the communist ideal. However, Stalinism was used as early as 1937 when Leon Trotsky wrote his pamphlet Stalinism and Bolshevism.

Writing two The Guardian articles in 2002 and 2006, British journalist Seumas Milne said that the impact of the post-Cold War narrative that Stalin and Hitler were twin evils, therefore communism is as monstrous as Nazism, "has been to relativize the unique crimes of Nazism, bury those of colonialism and feed the idea that any attempt at radical social change will always lead to suffering, killing and failure."

Public opinion 

In modern Russia, public opinion of Stalin and the former Soviet Union has improved in recent years. According to a 2015 Levada Center poll, 34% of respondents (up from 28% in 2007) say that leading the Soviet people to victory in World War II was such an outstanding achievement that it outweighed his mistakes. A 2019 Levada Center poll showed that support for Stalin, whom many Russians saw as the victor in the Great Patriotic War, reached a record high in the post-Soviet era, with 51% regarding Stalin as a positive figure and 70% saying his reign was good for the country.

Lev Gudkov, a sociologist at the Levada Center, said, "Vladimir Putin's Russia of 2012 needs symbols of authority and national strength, however controversial they may be, to validate the newly authoritarian political order. Stalin, a despotic leader responsible for mass bloodshed but also still identified with wartime victory and national unity, fits this need for symbols that reinforce the current political ideology."

Some positive sentiments can also be found elsewhere in the former Soviet Union. A 2012 survey commissioned by the Carnegie Endowment found 38% of Armenians concurring that their country "will always have need of a leader like Stalin". A 2013 survey by Tbilisi University found 45% of Georgians expressing "a positive attitude" toward Stalin.

See also 

 Anti-Stalinist left
 Bibliography of Stalinism and the Soviet Union
 Comparison of Nazism and Stalinism
 Everyday Stalinism
 Eastern Bloc
 Industrialization in the Soviet Union
 Juche
 Mass killings under communist regimes
 Soviet Empire
 Stalin's cult of personality
 Stalin's Peasants
 Stalin Society
 Stalinist architecture
 The Stalinist Legacy
 The Whisperers: Private Life in Stalin's Russia

References

Citations

Notes

Sources

Further reading 

Books
 Bullock, Alan. 1998. Hitler and Stalin: Parallel Lives (2nd ed.). Fontana Press.
 Campeanu, Pavel. 2016. Origins of Stalinism: From Leninist Revolution to Stalinist Society. Routledge.
 Conquest, Robert. 2008. The Great Terror: A Reassessment (40th anniversary ed.). Oxford University Press.
 Deutscher, Isaac. 1967. Stalin: A Political Biography (2nd edition). Oxford House. 
 Dobrenko, Evgeny. 2020. Late Stalinism (Yale University Press, 2020).
 Edele, Mark, ed. 2020. Debates on Stalinism: An introduction (Manchester University Press, 2020).
 Figes, Orlando. 2008. The Whisperers: Private Life in Stalin's Russia. Picador.
 Groys, Boris. 2014. The total art of Stalinism: Avant-Garde, aesthetic dictatorship, and beyond. Verso Books.
 Hasselmann, Anne E. 2021. "Memory Makers of the Great Patriotic War: Curator Agency and Visitor Participation in Soviet War Museums during Stalinism." Journal of Educational Media, Memory, and Society 13.1 (2021): 13–32.
 Hoffmann, David L. 2008. Stalinism: The Essential Readings. John Wiley & Sons.
 Hoffmann, David L. 2018. The Stalinist Era. Cambridge University Press.
 Kotkin, Stephen. 1997. Magnetic Mountain: Stalinism as a civilization. University of California Press.
 McCauley, Martin. 2019 Stalin and Stalinism (Routledge, 2019).
 Ree, Erik Van. 2002. The Political Thought of Joseph Stalin, A Study in Twentieth-century Revolutionary Patriotism. RoutledgeCurzon.
 Ryan, James, and Susan Grant, eds. 2020. Revisioning Stalin and Stalinism: Complexities, Contradictions, and Controversies (Bloomsbury Publishing, 2020).
 Sharlet, Robert. 2017. Stalinism and Soviet legal culture (Routledge, 2017).
 Tismăneanu, Vladimir. 2003. Stalinism for All Seasons: A Political History of Romanian Communism. University of California Press.
 Tucker, Robert C., ed. 2017. Stalinism: essays in historical interpretation. Routledge.
 Valiakhmetov, Albert, et al. 2018. "History And Historians In The Era Of Stalinism: A Review Of Modern Russian Historiography." National Academy of Managerial Staff of Culture and Arts Herald 1 (2018). online
 Velikanova, Olga. 2018. Mass Political Culture Under Stalinism: Popular Discussion of the Soviet Constitution of 1936 (Springer, 2018).
 Wood, Alan. 2004. Stalin and Stalinism (2nd ed.). Routledge.

Scholarly articles 
 Alexander, Kuzminykh. 2019. "The internal affairs agencies of the Soviet State in the period of Stalinism in the context of Russian historiography." Historia provinciae–the journal of regional history 3.1 (2019). online
 Barnett, Vincent. 2006. Understanding Stalinism: The 'Orwellian Discrepancy' and the 'Rational Choice Dictator'. Europe-Asia Studies, 58(3), 457–466.
 Edele, Mark. 2020. "New perspectives on Stalinism?: A conclusion." in Debates on Stalinism (Manchester University Press, 2020) pp. 270–281.
 Gill, Graeme. 2019. "Stalinism and Executive Power: Formal and Informal Contours of Stalinism." Europe-Asia Studies 71.6 (2019): 994–1012.
 Kamp, Marianne, and Russell Zanca. 2017. "Recollections of collectivization in Uzbekistan: Stalinism and local activism." Central Asian Survey 36.1 (2017): 55–72. online
 Kuzio, Taras. 2017. "Stalinism and Russian and Ukrainian national identities." Communist and Post-Communist Studies 50.4 (2017): 289–302.
 Lewin, Moshe. 2017. "The social background of Stalinism." in Stalinism (Routledge, 2017. 111–136).
 Mishler, Paul C. 2018. "Is the Term 'Stalinism' Valid and Useful for Marxist Analysis?." Science & Society 82.4 (2018): 555–567.
 Musiał, Filip. 2019. "Stalinism in Poland." The Person and the Challenges: Journal of Theology, Education, Canon Law and Social Studies Inspired by Pope John Paul II 9.2 (2019): 9–23. online
 Nelson, Todd H. 2015. "History as ideology: The portrayal of Stalinism and the Great Patriotic War in contemporary Russian high school textbooks." Post-Soviet Affairs, 31(1), 37–65.
 Nikiforov, S. A., et al. "Cultural revolution of Stalinism in its regional context." International Journal of Mechanical Engineering and Technology 9.11 (2018): 1229–1241' impact on schooling
 Wheatcroft, Stephen G. "Soviet statistics under Stalinism: Reliability and distortions in grain and population statistics." Europe-Asia Studies 71.6 (2019): 1013–1035.
 Winkler, Martina. 2017. "Children, Childhood, and Stalinism." Kritika 18(3), 628–637.
 Zawadzka, Anna. 2019. "Stalinism the Polish Way." Studia Litteraria et Historica 8 (2019): 1–6. online
 Zysiak, Agata. 2019. "Stalinism and Revolution in Universities. Democratization of Higher Education from Above, 1947–1956." Studia Litteraria et Historica 8 (2019): 1–17. online

Primary sources
 Stalin, Joseph. [1924] 1975. Foundations of Leninism. Foreign Languages Press.
 Stalin, Joseph (1951). Economic Problems of Socialism in the USSR. Foreign Languages Press.

External links 

 "Stalin Reference Archive". Marxists Internet Archive. Retrieved 11 May 2005.
 "Joseph Stalin". Spartacus Educational.
 "Joseph Stalin". BBC.
 Pedro Campos. "Basic Economic Precepts of Stalinist Socialism". Havana Times. 21 June 2010.

 
Anti-capitalism
Anti-fascism
Anti-revisionism
Authoritarianism
Communism
Economy of the Soviet Union
Eponymous political ideologies
Leninism
Marxism–Leninism
Politics of the Soviet Union
Totalitarianism
Types of socialism